The Principality of Islandia is an incipient  micronation that claims Coffee Caye in the Caribbean Sea off the coast of Belize as its territory. Coffee Caye is a currently uninhabited island of  separated by a short boat trip from Belize City. Founded in 2018 by Gareth Johnson and Marshall Mayer, the project is the first attempt to create a micronation to be crowdfunded. At present the island, which is covered in mangroves and surrounded by coral reefs, can be rented for camping excursions.

References

External links
Official website
CNN – A tour of Coffee Caye, earmarked for micronation Islandia (photos)

Micronations
Private islands of Belize